Michael Joseph O'Rourke  (September 1, 1868 – March 3, 1934) was a Major League Baseball pitcher. He pitched for the Baltimore Orioles of the American Association in eight games during the 1890 baseball season.

External links

Major League Baseball pitchers
Major League Baseball outfielders
Baltimore Orioles (AA) players
19th-century baseball players
1868 births
1934 deaths
Albany Senators players
Troy Trojans (minor league) players
Baltimore Orioles (IL) players
Baltimore Orioles (Atlantic Association) players